Solar power in Vermont provides almost 11% of the state's in-state electricity production as of 2018. A 2009 study indicated that distributed solar on rooftops can provide 18% of all electricity used in Vermont. A 2012 estimate suggests that a typical 5 kW system costing $25,000 before credits and utility savings will pay for itself in 10 years, and generate a profit of $34,956 over the rest of its 25-year life.

Net metering is available for up to at least 500 kW generation, but is capped at 15% of utilities peak demand. Excess generation is rolled over each month but is lost once each year. Group net metering is also allowed. Vermont is given an A for net metering and a C for interconnection. A feed-in tariff was created in 2009, but is limited to 50 MW and is fully subscribed. The cap increases by 5 to 10 MW/year starting in 2013 until it reaches 127.5 MW in 2022. It is available for solar, wind, methane, and biomass. Seven solar projects are receiving payments, of $0.30/kWh, for 25 years.

Installed capacity

Solar farms

In 2012, Vermont had five solar arrays of at least 1 MW, the 2.2 MW SunGen Sharon 1 in Sharon. the 2.1 MW concentrating photovoltaics array installed in July 2011 in South Burlington, the 1.5 MW photovoltaic array also in South Burlington installed in October 2011, the 1 MW photovoltaic array in Ferrisburgh, and the 2 MW Williamstown Solar Project.

As of 2019, Green Mountain Power (GMP) has further constructed several solar arrays as large as 5 MW.   In 2015, the 20 MW Coolidge solar farm near Ludlow was opposed by GMP, which claimed that there was no need for such utility-scale solar in the state.  The farm was completed by NextEra Energy at the end of 2018.

Generation
Using data available from the U.S. Energy Information Agency's Electric Power Annual 2017 and "Electric Power Monthly Data Browser", the following table summarizes Vermonts’s solar energy posture.

Capacity factor for each year was computed from the end-of-year summer capacity.
2017 data is from Electric Power Monthly and is subject to change.

A small-scale 15KW installation at a homestead in middle Vermont generated 19,480 kWh of electrical energy at a Capacity Factor of 0.15.    The homestead was sending energy to the utility when it was produced and taking energy from the utility when needed. Overall, the homestead consumed 80% of its generation and sold the remaining 20% to the utility. The generation profile is shown in the chart.

Beginning with the 2014 data year, the Energy Information Administration (EIA) has estimated the distributed solar-photovoltaic generation and distributed solar-photovoltaic capacity. These non-utility-scale appraisals evaluate that Vermont generated the following amounts of additional solar energy:

See also
Wind power in Vermont
Solar power in the United States
Renewable energy in the United States

References

External links

 Incentives and policies

Energy in Vermont
Vermont